Cleone is a 1758 tragedy by the British writer Robert Dodsley.

The original Covent Garden cast included David Ross as Silfroy, Luke Sparks as Glanville, Isaac Ridout as Beaufort senior and George Anne Bellamy as Cleone.

References

Bibliography
 Nicoll, Allardyce. A History of English Drama 1660–1900: Volume III. Cambridge University Press, 2009.
 Hogan, C.B (ed.) The London Stage, 1660–1800: Volume V. Southern Illinois University Press, 1968.

1758 plays
British plays
Tragedy plays
West End plays